Ivan Zakharov (1816 – 1885) was a Russian diplomat

Ivan Zakharov may also refer to:

 Ivan Zakharov (footballer, born 1998), Russian football player
 Ivan Zakharov (footballer, born 2000), Russian football player